The 2009 A-League Grand Final took place at Telstra Dome in Melbourne, Australia on 28 February 2009.

It was the final match in the A-League 2008–09 season, and was played between premiers Melbourne Victory and runners-up Adelaide United. Melbourne Victory won the match 1–0 and became the winners of the 2008–09 Championship, thus becoming the first team to win the A-League domestic treble, after also claiming the 2008 Pre-Season Challenge Cup, and the 2008–09 Premiership.

The Grand Final was the last event to be held at the Telstra Dome, the former name of Melbourne's Docklands Stadium. Due to a change in sponsorship, the stadium is now known as Etihad Stadium.

Route to the finals

Match

Summary
With both teams down to ten men for the last 25 minutes, Adelaide were left scoreless with Melbourne taking their second A-League championship medal. Pondeljak's goal earned him the prestigious Joe Marston Medal.

A contentious early red card given to the lone Adelaide striker Cristiano by referee Matthew Breeze saw the Reds go down to ten men by the tenth minute. However, Adelaide managed to hold back Melbourne from scoring until Tom Pondeljak scored 23 metres out from goal in the 60th minute to allow Melbourne to take the lead.

Five minutes later, Melbourne striker Daniel Allsopp was also sent off for allegedly headbutting Adelaide's Robert Cornthwaite in an incident in the Melbourne penalty box.

Both Cristiano and Allsopp's red cards were revoked by the Football Federation Australia in a post-match conference.

Details

Statistics

Controversy
The red card to Adelaide talisman Cristiano after just 10 minutes in the championship decider against Melbourne Victory created a lot of controversy post match. The Brazilian starlet had been warned before that referee Matthew Breeze would send him off if he suspected anything untoward about his heading with flailing arms. He felt as though he was a marked man all season by referee Matthew Breeze " I couldn't sleep after the game."

Fox Sports analyst and Former Australia international Robbie Slater claimed the referee made the wrong call, "ruined" the Grand Final and argued that the A-League should hire an elite overseas official to handle its championship game.

See also
 2008–09 A-League
 List of A-League champions

References

External links
 Official A-League Website

2008–09 A-League season
A-League Men Grand Finals
Adelaide United FC matches
Melbourne Victory FC matches
Soccer in Melbourne